Rosemont Elementary School may refer to:
 Rosemont Elementary School in School District 8 Kootenay Lake, British Columbia, Canada
 Rosemont Elementary School, Florida; see Orange County Public Schools
 Rosemont Elementary School, the only elementary school of the Rosemont School District in Rosemont, Illinois
 Rosemont Elementary School in the Fort Worth Independent School District in Texas